Asociación Deportiva Sagrada Cena was a Spanish football club based in Cáceres, in the autonomous community of Extremadura. Sagrada Cena, formed in 1999, it was mainly a football academy rather than a professional club.

The club was disbanded in August 2010, due to limited budget available and the removal of public grants.

References

External links
2009–10 Regional Preferente 

Association football clubs established in 1999
Defunct football clubs in Extremadura
Association football clubs disestablished in 2010
1999 establishments in Spain
2010 disestablishments in Spain